Badam-e Dan (also Romanized as Bādām-e Dān; also known as Bādām-e ‘Olyā) is a village in Maskun Rural District, Jebalbarez District, Jiroft County, Kerman Province, Iran. At the 2006 census, its population was 68, in 10 families.

References 

Populated places in Jiroft County